Barbers Hill Independent School District is a public school district based in Mont Belvieu, Texas (USA).

Composition
The district is an exurban district encompassing  in western Chambers County, Texas, strategically located at the intersection of Interstate 10 and State Highway 146. Its borders consist of the Trinity River on the east to Harris County line on the west; from Trinity Bay is on the south to Liberty County line on the North.  This large area contains four distinct communities: Mont Belvieu, Old River-Winfree, Cove, and Beach City. The district has experienced a fast annual growth rate, recently reaching 9.5% and has approximately 3400 students.

As of 2017, Barbers Hill ISD has a total of 11 schools.

Regular instructional
High School(s) 
 Barbers Hill High School (9–12)Intermediate Schools Barbers Hill Middle School North (6–8)
 Barbers Hill Middle School South (6-8)Elementary Schools'''
 Barbers Hill Elementary School North (2-5)
 Barbers Hill Elementary School South (2-5)
 Barbers Hill Primary (1)
 Barbers Hill Kindergarten Center (K)

Alternative instructional
Hardin Chambers Alternative
Alternative School
Adaptive Behavioral Unit
Barbers Hill DAEP/EPIC (Disciplinary Alternative Education Program/Eagle Positive Intervention Center)

Academic achievement
In 2009, the school district was rated "recognized" by the Texas Education Agency.

Dress code controversy
In January 2020, school authorities suspended DeAndre Arnold, an African-American senior at Barbers Hill, and informed him that he would have to attend in school suspension due to the length of his hair. The district, which had changed its dress code policy over winter break, newly excluded boys from wearing their hair gathered into a ponytail. Arnold's hairstyle, which he had worn for 8 years, is an homage to his Trinidadian roots. All of the board members, in July 2020, voted to retain the prohibition on long hair for male students. In August 2020, a federal judge ruled that the school district's hair policy was discriminatory and could not be enforced.

See also

List of school districts in Texas

References

External links
 

School districts in Chambers County, Texas